The Thomas Crane Public Library (TCPL) is a city library in Quincy, Massachusetts. It is noted for its architecture. It was funded by the Crane family as a memorial to Thomas Crane, a wealthy stone contractor who got his start in the Quincy quarries. The Thomas Crane Library has the second largest municipal collection in Massachusetts after the Boston Public Library.

Architecture
The Thomas Crane Public Library was built in four stages: the original building (1882) by architect H. H. Richardson; an additional ell with stack space and stained glass (1908) by William Martin Aiken in Richardson's style; a major expansion (1939) by architects Paul A. and Carroll Coletti, with stone carvings by sculptor Joseph Coletti of Quincy; and a recent addition (2001) by Boston architects Childs, Bertman, and Tseckares, which doubled the size of the library. H. H. Richardson considered this library among his most successful civic buildings, and Harper's Weekly called it "the best village library in the United States". The library was ranked 43rd in a national poll conducted in 2007 by the American Institute of Architects of the favorite buildings in the nation.

In addition to its architecture, the original building contains a 30 × 10 inch stained-glass window by noted American artist John LaFarge in memory of Thomas Crane, entitled the Old Philosopher. To the left of the elaborate carved fireplace is a second LaFarge window, "Angel at the Tomb", given in memory of Crane's son Benjamin Franklin Crane. The library's grounds were designed by landscaper Frederick Law Olmsted.

The main library was designated a National Historic Landmark in 1987, recognizing it as one of Richardson's finest library buildings.

Branches

By 1910 there were two "reading rooms," one in the Atlantic neighborhood on Atlantic Street and one in West Quincy.  By the 1920s the system had expanded to nine branches in all, adding ones near the Parker Elementary School and the Furnace Brook Parkway, and ones in the Squantum, South Quincy, Wollaston and Quincy Point neighborhoods. Municipal budget cutbacks in 1981 slashed the number to just three besides the main building: the Wollaston branch (1922), which is listed separately on the National Register of Historic Places, the North Quincy branch (1963) on Hancock Street near North Quincy High School, and the Adams Shore branch (1970) on Sea Street in Hough's Neck.

Community
The library often hosts concerts, lectures and art exhibitions. There are also private rooms available for use free of charge to the public or to small community organizations.  Also, the library hosts Quincy's local public-access television cable TV channel, QATV.

See also
List of National Historic Landmarks in Massachusetts
National Register of Historic Places listings in Quincy, Massachusetts

References

External links

Thomas Crane Public Library Website
Thomas Crane Library Quincy, Massachusetts:  Dedication October 14, 2001
Quincy Access Television

Library buildings completed in 1882
Public libraries in Massachusetts
Crane Public Library
National Historic Landmarks in Massachusetts
Richardsonian Romanesque architecture in Massachusetts
Buildings and structures in Quincy, Massachusetts
Libraries on the National Register of Historic Places in Massachusetts
Libraries in Norfolk County, Massachusetts
Tourist attractions in Quincy, Massachusetts
National Register of Historic Places in Quincy, Massachusetts